Luang Prabang or Louangphrabang is a city in Laos.

Luang Prabang may also refer to:
Luang Prabang Province, Laos
Kingdom of Luang Phrabang, formed in 1707 as a result of the split of the Kingdom of Lan Xang in Laos
"Luang Prabang" (song), a song written by Dave Van Ronk
Luang Prabang Range, a mountain range straddling northwestern Laos and Northern Thailand